Thomas Alan White (born 9 May 1997) is an English professional footballer who plays as a midfielder for Barrow.

Club career

Gateshead
After playing for a boys clubs with future Blackburn teammate Adam Armstrong and youth football for Carlisle United, he signed for Gateshead at the age of 18. His time with Gateshead was hindered by injury, and in 2016 the club initially withdrew their offer of a professional contract due to his injuries. He remained with the club to use their training facilities as he recovered, and he also spent loan spells at Spennymoor Town (signing for them in January 2017), West Auckland Town (signing for them in September 2017), Ashington (signing for them in November 2017) and Scarborough Athletic (signing for them in January 2018). During this time he relied on borrowing money from his parents for petrol so he could get to training. The 2018–19 season was a "breakthrough" for him at the club as he made 43 league appearances for them that season.

Blackburn Rovers
He signed a two-year contract with Blackburn Rovers in July 2019. At Blackburn he initially played with the under-23 team, before moving on loan to Barrow in November 2019. In January 2020 he extended the loan until the end of the season, and later that month recovered from a chest infection. The loan deal had ended by 22 April 2020.

On 28 July 2020 he moved on loan to Bolton Wanderers for the 2019–20 season. His debut came on 5 September in Bolton's first match of the season, a 1–2 home defeat against Bradford in the first round of the EFL Cup. His league debut came on 12 September in Bolton's first league match of the season, a 1-0 home defeat against Forest Green Rovers. On 2 February 2021, his loan spell came to an end and he returned to Blackburn. On 5 February 2021, White signed for National League side Hartlepool United on a short-term loan deal. The loan was then extended until 15 May 2021.

On 14 May 2021 it was announced that he would leave Blackburn at the end of the season, following the expiry of his contract. On 8 June 2021 it was announced that he would re-sign for Barrow on a permanent contract after that time.

International career
White earned two caps with England C during the 2018–19 season.

Career statistics

Honours
Barrow
National League: 2019–20

References

1997 births
Living people
English footballers
England semi-pro international footballers
Association football midfielders
Carlisle United F.C. players
Gateshead F.C. players
Spennymoor Town F.C. players
West Auckland Town F.C. players
Ashington A.F.C. players
Scarborough Athletic F.C. players
Blackburn Rovers F.C. players
Barrow A.F.C. players
Bolton Wanderers F.C. players
Hartlepool United F.C. players
National League (English football) players
English Football League players